Antsohimbondrona (also called: Port Saint-Louis) is a municipality in Madagascar. It belongs to the district of Ambilobe, which is a part of Diana Region. According to 2001 census the population of Antsohimbondrona was 32080.

Antsohimbondrona has a maritime harbour. Primary and junior level secondary education are available in town. The town provides access to hospital services to its citizens. It is also a site of industrial-scale mining.

The majority (65%) of the population are farmers. The most important crop is sugarcane, while other important products are cotton and rice. Industry and services provide employment for 13% and 7% of the population, respectively. Additionally fishing employs 15% of the population.

Roads
The provincial road 20D leads to Antsohimbondrona from Ambilobe.

References and notes

Populated places in Diana Region